Cyperus calderoniae is a species of sedge that is native to parts of Mexico.

See also 
 List of Cyperus species

References 

calderoniae
Plants described in 1985
Flora of Mexico